Sreedham Sreeangon or Sriangan is an Ashram set up by Prabhu Jagadbandhu of the Mahanam Sampraday in Faridpur, Bangladesh in 1899 C.E. This ashram is the headquarters of the Mahanam Sampraday in Bangladesh.  During the Bangladesh liberation war of 1971 the Pakistani Army killed 8 monks in the Ashram while they were praying and damaged the ashram. Janmastami is celebrated with great religious fervour every year. A procession in honour of the Hindu God Krishna is taken through the town.

References

Hindu ashrams in Bangladesh
War crimes in Bangladesh
1899 establishments in India